Keene is an unincorporated community located in the town of Buena Vista, Portage County, Wisconsin, United States. The community is likely named for Valentine and Kate Keene, who emigrated to the area from Poland in the 1860s. The Keene post office operated from 1870 to 1904.

Notes

Unincorporated communities in Portage County, Wisconsin
Unincorporated communities in Wisconsin